Northupite is an uncommon evaporite mineral, with the chemical formula Na3Mg(CO3)2Cl. It occurs as colourless to dark grey or brown octahedral crystals and as globular masses. In synthetic material it forms a series with tychite (Na6Mg2(CO3)4SO4).

It was discovered in 1895 at Searles Lake, San Bernardino County, California by C. H. Northup (born 1861) from San Jose, California, for whom Northupite is named. 

It occurs associated with tychite, pirssonite at Searles Lake and with shortite, trona, pirssonite, gaylussite, labuntsovite, searlesite, norsethite, loughlinite, pyrite and quartz in the Green River Formation of Wyoming.

References

Carbonate minerals
Sodium minerals
Cubic minerals
Minerals in space group 203
Minerals described in 1895